Dobromiri is a village in the municipality of Novaci, North Macedonia.

Demographics
Dobromiri is attested in the Ottoman defter of 1467/68 as a village in the vilayet of Manastir. The majority of the inhabitants attested bore typical Slavic anthroponyms, with a small minority exhibiting Albanian anthroponyms such as Arbanash and Leko.
 
According to the 2002 census, the village had a total of 345 inhabitants. Ethnic groups in the village include:

Macedonians 344
Aromanians 1

References

Villages in Novaci Municipality